National Highway 254, commonly referred to as NH 254, is a national highway in  India. It is a spur road of National Highway 54. NH-254 traverses the states of Punjab and Haryana in India.

Route 
Punjab
Mudki - Baghapurana -jawahar singh wala -Dina -Salabatpura - Rampura - Maur - Takth Sri Damdama Sahib - Raman mandi- Haryana Border.
Haryana
Punjab Border- Near Dabwali.

Junctions  

  Terminal near Mudki.
  near Bagha Purana.
  near Rampura Phul.
  near Maur
  Terminal near Raman.

See also 

 List of National Highways in India
 List of National Highways in India by state

References

External links 

 NH 254 on OpenStreetMap
{
  "type": "FeatureCollection",
  "features": [
    {
      "type": "Feature",
      "properties": {},
      "geometry": {
        "type": "LineString",
        "coordinates": [
          [
            75.229199407913,
            30.485500541569
          ],
          [
            75.230315206863,
            30.490574425042
          ]
        ]
      }
    },
    {
      "type": "Feature",
      "properties": {},
      "geometry": {
        "type": "LineString",
        "coordinates": [
          [
            75.230289456085,
            30.490692760964
          ],
          [
            75.230289456085,
            30.497260305176
          ],
          [
            75.235885615402,
            30.505779698412
          ]
        ]
      }
    },
    {
      "type": "Feature",
      "properties": {},
      "geometry": {
        "type": "LineString",
        "coordinates": [
          [
            75.235885607544,
            30.506045921552
          ],
          [
            75.234512316529,
            30.540707327188
          ]
        ]
      }
    },
    {
      "type": "Feature",
      "properties": {},
      "geometry": {
        "type": "LineString",
        "coordinates": [
          [
            75.233963008504,
            30.540648181572
          ],
          [
            75.226409907918,
            30.55637778475
          ],
          [
            75.223800663371,
            30.560043719877
          ],
          [
            75.237808227539,
            30.584637360474
          ],
          [
            75.234786991496,
            30.592085165702
          ],
          [
            75.24179077358,
            30.599887012423
          ]
        ]
      }
    },
    {
      "type": "Feature",
      "properties": {},
      "geometry": {
        "type": "LineString",
        "coordinates": [
          [
            75.241996769328,
            30.600389385136
          ],
          [
            75.245841977885,
            30.609490701437
          ]
        ]
      }
    },
    {
      "type": "Feature",
      "properties": {},
      "geometry": {
        "type": "LineString",
        "coordinates": [
          [
            75.245704650879,
            30.609727084237
          ],
          [
            75.208488461212,
            30.628990637805
          ]
        ]
      }
    },
    {
      "type": "Feature",
      "properties": {},
      "geometry": {
        "type": "LineString",
        "coordinates": [
          [
            75.20903776399793,
            30.629463309863393
          ],
          [
            75.09536361510983,
            30.684506998544155
          ]
        ]
      }
    }
  ]
}

National highways in India
National Highways in Punjab, India
National Highways in Haryana